In mathematics, the Pincherle polynomials Pn(x) are polynomials introduced by  given by the generating function

Humbert polynomials are a generalization of Pincherle polynomials

References

Polynomials